WTTU (88.5 FM) is a radio station broadcasting an alternative rock format and licensed to Cookeville, Tennessee, US.  The station is currently owned by Tennessee Technological University. The station broadcasts with 2,000 watts of power.

Station management
Drake Fenlon, Program Director 
William Sheckler, Public Affairs Director 
Patrick Ward, Music Director 
Dillon James, News/Sports Director

References

External links

TTU
TTU